Firewater is Hardi Volmer's history-based thriller released in 1994.

Tulivesi is based on the historical situation in Estonia at the end of 1920s and sets a precedent of the struggle between the Estonian government and the spirit-smugglers. This film is dedicated to those who carry on the difficult and hopeless struggle against the narcotic business.

Plot
At the end of the 1920s the Finnish government proclaimed dry law which lasted 12 years. Estonian bootleggers living on the neighboring coast of the Gulf of Finland profited from prohibition which staggered Finnish economy. In the fishermen's fictional village called Ropsi accedes a new honest chief of the border guard station, lieutenant Aleksander Kattai (role cast by Jaan Tätte) who wants to "lay down the law and order". At the same time the most famous of the village's spirit-smugglers, Eerik Ekström (Erik Ruus) drives over the Gulf of Finland with his queuely firewater-cargo. He has spirit cans in his boat and also behind it in the sequential position (spirit smugglers call it "spirit-torpedo") Lieutenant Kattai sees on those days Hilda Sibul, the Ekström's fiancée. This role is performed by an actress Epp Eespäev. They fall in love, but their good relationship does not last long.

In this point start the thrilling escapes and catchings, the plot's sting of the tails. Lieutenant Kattai finds out the very high governmental circles are involved to "the Ropsi firewater-smuggling case". An Estonian minister Tui (Lembit Ulfsak) and a high-rank officer of the Estonian Navy papa Nymann (Ain Lutsepp) profit from the contrabandism and want to bull through dry law also in the Estonian parliament. Minister Tui agitates for dry law using extremely hypocritical methods (indications to the temperance movement). Lieutenant Kattai's background is interesting, so he opens himself: "I am lieutenant Kattai, a former soldier of armoured train unit number two. After the war I remained with the border of guard. Until now I was at the southern border, near Pihkva. There was firing every day, Russian salesmen and smugglers, red agents." Those facts indicate to the Estonian War of Independence.

Background
The first period of independence has always been very honoured among the Estonians and they named these 21 years "the golden age of Estonia". "Firewater" movie seems to be tender, postcard-like remembrance of these days. A serious question "is this the same Estonia we fought for?" echoes through the film. Because of feeling critics named the film "the best Estonian thriller ever".1

Tulivesi premiered in fall 1994 and received the first award of the Estonian Movie Critics Association. The author of original music was Olav Ehala, cinematography was by Arko Okk. The plot was written by Ott Sandrak and Hardi Volmer.

Cast
Epp Eespäev as Hilda 
Erik Ruus as Eerik 
Jaan Tätte as Aleks 
Ain Lutsepp as Nymann 
Lembit Ulfsak as Tui
Tõnu Kark as Julius 
Raivo Mets as Mart 
Eduard Toman as Einari 
Marko Matvere as Pilli-Villu 
Eve Kivi as Lulu 
Arvo Kukumägi as Türgi Joss 
Janika Piibemaa as Tui's secretary 
Enn Kraam as Eerik's father

References

External links
"Tulivesi" in the home page of Estonian Television.
 

1994 films
Estonian thriller films